Jefferson Township is a township in Shelby County, Iowa. There are 593 people and 16.6 people per square mile in Jefferson Township. The total area is 35.7 square miles.

References

Townships in Shelby County, Iowa
Townships in Iowa